Brian Holguin is an American writer who works in the comics industry.

Work
Holguin is known for his work on Aria and Todd McFarlane's Spawn.

He also wrote Spawn: Godslayer, a dark fantasy re-imagining of Spawn.

Partial bibliography

Aria (1999)
 Aria/Angela: Heavenly Creatures (2000)
 Aria: The Soul Market (2001)
 Aria: A Midwinter's Dream (2002)
 Aria: Summer's Spell (2002)
 Aria: The Uses of Enchantment (2003)

KISS: Psycho Circus (1997)
 KISS: Psycho Circus Vol. 01 - 'Book One'

Mr Majestic (1999)
 Mr Majestic with co-writer Joe Casey and artist Ed McGuiness (Trade paperback collects Mr Majestic Vol 1. Nos 1–6)

Spawn (1998–2005)
 Spawn issues 71–150, 185-190

Spawn: The Dark Ages (1999–2000)
 Spawn: The Dark Ages issues 1-14

References

External links
 Complete Bibliography http://www.comicbookdb.com/creator_chron.php?ID=3028

Year of birth missing (living people)
Living people
American comics writers